Debora Caprioglio (born 3 May 1968) is an Italian actress. Internationally, she is best known for playing the title character in the 1991 film Paprika by Tinto Brass and a relationship with Klaus Kinski from 1987–1989. In 2007, she took part in the Italian version of the reality show Celebrity Survivor (L'isola dei famosi).

Private life 

In 2008 she married actor and director Angelo Maresca. They divorced in 2018. She considers herself Catholic.

Selected filmography
Grandi cacciatori (1988)
Kinski Paganini (1989)
Paprika (1991)
 (1992)
With Closed Eyes (1994)
Love Story with Cramps (1995)
Samson and Delilah (1996)
Albergo Roma (1996)
Provaci ancora prof! (2005, TV series)
Colpi di fulmine (2012)

Note

External links
 
 

1968 births
Living people
Actors from Venice
Italian film actresses
Italian television actresses
Survivor (franchise) contestants
People from Mestre-Carpenedo
Italian Roman Catholics